François Barouh (born 16 January 1955) is a French sprint canoer. He competed from the late 1970s to the mid-1980s.

Competing in two Summer Olympics, Barouh won a bronze medal in the K-4 1000 m event at Los Angeles in 1984.

References

1955 births
Canoeists at the 1980 Summer Olympics
Canoeists at the 1984 Summer Olympics
French male canoeists
Living people
Olympic canoeists of France
Olympic bronze medalists for France
Olympic medalists in canoeing
Medalists at the 1984 Summer Olympics